Breaza  is a commune in Mureș County, Transylvania, Romania. It is composed of three villages: Breaza, Filpișu Mare (Magyarfülpös; Ungarisch-Phelpsdorf) and Filpișu Mic (Kisfülpös).

See also 
 List of Hungarian exonyms (Mureș County)

References

Communes in Mureș County
Localities in Transylvania
Székely communities